Helvella queletii is a species of fungi in the family Helvellaceae of the order Pezizales.

References

queletii
Fungi of Europe
Fungi described in 1882
Taxa named by Giacomo Bresadola